Billund Municipality can be categorized as a quite blue municipality, having voted for parties of the blue bloc by 65%, the fifth most of the 98 municipalities in Denmark,
in the 2019 Danish general election.

Ib Kristensen from Venstre had been mayor of Billund Municipality ever since the 2007 municipal reform. However, in September 2020, he announced that he would not stand for re-election, stating that he saw himself as too old. Already in November 2020, 37-year old Stephanie Storbank could announce that she had the support to become the new mayor candidate for Venstre in the election the following year.

In the election result, Venstre would increase their vote share by 1.3% and once again become the biggest party, although they didn't win any new seats. It was later announced that Venstre and the Social Democrats, who together had won 17 of the 25 seats, had reached an agreement that would see Stephanie Storbank become the new mayor.

Electoral system
For elections to Danish municipalities, a number varying from 9 to 31 are chosen to be elected to the municipal council. The seats are then allocated using the D'Hondt method and a closed list proportional representation.
Billund Municipality had 25 seats in 2021

Unlike in Danish General Elections, in elections to municipal councils, electoral alliances are allowed.

Electoral alliances  

Electoral Alliance 1

Electoral Alliance 2

Electoral Alliance 3

Results

Notes

References 

Billund